The Hernando de Soto Bridge is a tied-arch bridge carrying Interstate 40 across the Mississippi River between West Memphis, Arkansas, and Memphis, Tennessee.  The design is a continuous cantilevered cable-stayed steel through arch, with bedstead endposts. Memphians also call the bridge the "New Bridge", as it is newer than the Memphis & Arkansas Bridge (carrying Interstate 55) downstream, and the "M Bridge", due to its distinctive shape. It is of similar construction to the Sherman Minton Bridge between Louisville, Kentucky, and New Albany, Indiana.

History
Preliminary planning for the river crossing began in 1960 as part of Interstate 40 alignment studies for the Memphis - Little Rock corridor, which was constructed in segments between 1963 and 1968.

The two states initially feuded over the cost of paying for the bridge. Tennessee officials believed that both states should equally pay for the bridge, while Arkansas officials wanted Tennessee to shoulder a larger share of the cost due to its larger population. Both states eventually agreed to a compromise where Tennessee funded 60% of the cost and Arkansas the remaining 40%. Both states also initially disagreed on the design of the bridge; the original design called for longer through arches and a lower vertical clearance. 
 
Construction of the Hernando de Soto Bridge began on May 2, 1967. Initially planned for completion in 1971, the project experienced multiple delays. The double-arch bridge was opened to automobile traffic on August 2, 1973. A dedication ceremony for the bridge occurred on August 17, 1973. Initially expected to be only $12 million (equivalent to $ in ), the final price tag was approximately $57 million (equivalent to $ in ).

The bridge is named for 16th century Spanish explorer Hernando de Soto, who explored this stretch of the Mississippi River and died south of Memphis.

Bridge illumination
At night, the bridge was illuminated by 200 sodium vapor lights along its "M" structure. The bridge was first illuminated on September 5, 1986, after $373,000 of private funds had been raised to fund the cost and installation of the lights. Due to some river traffic having issues with the lights at night reflecting on the water, the city installed a remote switch to toggle the lights on and off briefly while the vessel passes under the bridge. During the 2011 Mississippi River floods, the bridge became dark for about 2 months because the transformers that supply the electricity for the lights were removed to prevent damage to them by flood waters. The bridge was re-lit in a ceremony which occurred on June 21, 2011.

It was announced after the opening of the Big River Crossing along the Harahan Bridge to the south that the existing sodium vapor lights along the Hernando Desoto Bridge would be replaced with a new LED lighting display, thus making the Hernando de Soto Bridge the second bridge over the Mississippi River to be lit as such after the Harahan. The new display can be lit in sync with the Harahan Bridge and display various color patterns dependent upon special occasions or requests. Both displays have been created under an initiative called "Mighty Lights." The $14 million privately funded project was completed in 2018.

Seismic retrofit project
Between 2000 and 2015, the bridge underwent a seismic retrofitting project, allowing it to withstand a 7.7 magnitude earthquake, the similar magnitude of earthquakes during the 1811–12 New Madrid earthquakes. The retrofit project is also a means to protect the bridge as it is located within  of the New Madrid Seismic Zone and serves as a major cargo route and traffic thoroughfare across the river. As part of this project, the main span, approaches, and ramps for the downtown exit were retrofitted. The federal government covered 80% of the cost, with Tennessee contributing 12% and Arkansas 8%.

Incidents

On August 23, 2007, an inspector discovered that a bridge pier on the approach bridge west of the river had settled overnight, and the bridge was subsequently closed to perform a precautionary inspection. The bridge was reopened later that day.

On May 11, 2021, an inspection discovered a partially fractured tie girder on the Span A North truss. Two of the four plates comprising the box-shaped tension tie member were completely fractured and the bottom plate was partially fractured, leaving only the inside-facing plate intact. Since the severely compromised girder was one of a pair of load-bearing tension members that were critical to the structural integrity of the bridge's tied-arch design, the bridge was structurally unsound and at risk of collapse. The inspecting engineer called 9-1-1 and told authorities to shut down the bridge immediately.  Traffic across and under the bridge was halted indefinitely while engineers inspected the rest of the bridge for other issues, and analyzed the structure. 

River traffic under the bridge resumed on May 14. Initial repairs that affixed steel plates on both sides of the affected girder were completed on May 25. The second phase consisted of the installation of additional steel plating and removal of part of the damaged beam. A new inspection of the bridge found "nothing of concern". The eastbound lanes reopened on July 31, 2021, the westbound lanes on August 2, 2021. During the closure, vehicle traffic utilized the nearby Memphis & Arkansas Bridge (I-55) as an alternate route in the Memphis area, as well as the Caruthersville Bridge (I-155) to the north and the Helena Bridge (US 49) to the south as alternates elsewhere in the Mid-South.

Investigators received amateur photos taken from the river below as early as 2016 that already showed damage at the same site. And according to the Arkansas Department of Transportation, review of archived drone footage taken during a May 2019 bridge inspection, two years before the damage was discovered, also showed the fracture. The department further found that the mandated hands-on—that is, within arm's length—inspections that should have occurred every two years had not been undertaken. The responsible inspector was subsequently fired.

An engineering analysis revealed the fracture was the result of two particularly wide and poorly done weld repairs in the same spot during "fabrication" (construction) that, along with other poor welds elsewhere on the bridge, had been identified and repaired; there were consequently no further concerns. Key findings of the report included the following four points:

Gallery

See also
 
 
 
 List of crossings of the Lower Mississippi River

References

External links
 

Through arch bridges in the United States
Landmarks in Tennessee
Bridges over the Mississippi River
Bridges in Memphis, Tennessee
Bridges completed in 1973
Buildings and structures in West Memphis, Arkansas
Transportation in Crittenden County, Arkansas
Road bridges in Tennessee
Road bridges in Arkansas
Interstate 40
Bridges on the Interstate Highway System
Interstate vehicle bridges in the United States
1973 establishments in Arkansas
1973 establishments in Tennessee
Tied arch bridges in the United States